The Coast Line is a railroad line between Burbank, California and the San Francisco Bay Area, roughly along the Pacific Coast. It is the shortest rail route between Los Angeles and the Bay Area.

History

Predecessors
The San Francisco and San Jose Railroad built the first segment of the line from San Francisco to San Jose between 1860 and 1864. The founders of the SF&SJ incorporated as the Southern Pacific Railroad, which was authorized by Congress in 1866 to connect the line from San Jose south to Needles, where it would meet the Atlantic & Pacific Railroad. However, SP had built to Tres Pinos by 1873 and abandoned efforts to continue the line to Coalinga, instead choosing a route from Lathrop.

By 1871, SP had completed a line south from San Jose through Gilroy and Pajaro, arriving at Salinas in 1872 and Soledad in 1873. SP halted southward work at Soledad for thirteen years and started building north from Los Angeles in 1873, completing a line to Burbank. In 1886, SP had pushed south from Soledad to King City, Paso Robles, and Templeton; by 1887, the southern portion of the line had been extended through Newhall, Saugus, and Santa Paula to Santa Barbara.

By 1894, SP had extended the line south over the Cuesta Pass from Templeton to San Luis Obispo. The work continued south to Guadalupe in 1895 and Surf in 1896. The  gap between Surf and Santa Barbara was closed with the last spike driven on December 28, 1900.

The first version of the Coast Line, via Saugus and Santa Paula through the Santa Clara River Valley, was completed by the Southern Pacific Railroad on December 31, 1900. 

The work between Ventura and Carpenteria eventually allowed the construction of the Rincon sea-level road for automobile traffic to travel this formerly impassible section of coastline.

Work on the Montalvo Cutoff, which crossed the Santa Clara River to serve the farmers in the Oxnard Plain and was extended to Santa Susana in Simi Valley, began in 1898. The Santa Susana Tunnel opened in 1904 connecting with the Chatsworth cutoff from Burbank and thereafter was the main line. Passenger and freight traffic declined dramatically at the Hueneme wharf in Ventura County as they shifted to the railroad. A new straighter track was built between Chatsworth and Burbank to coincide with the new route, and the original line through the San Fernando Valley was designated as the Burbank branch. In 1907, the Bayshore Cutoff opened from San Bruno to San Francisco, relegating the original main line through the Bernal Cut to branch status. In 1935 the new line around downtown San Jose opened and thereafter was the main line.

In the golden era of passenger service, SP trains on the San Francisco leg of this route ran from the Third and Townsend Depot in San Francisco to the Union Station in Los Angeles. The Oakland–Los Angeles trains originated from the 16th Street Station in Oakland.

Current lines

The line has several subdivisions. Ownership is currently split into three segments:
 Caltrain (PCJPB) from CP Lick (MP 51.6, south of Tamien yard) north to San Francisco
 Union Pacific Railroad (UP), which merged with Southern Pacific (SP) in 1996, from CP Lick south to the north end of Moorpark
 Between CP Lick (MP 51.6) and CP Coast (MP 43.9), the Coast Line is owned by PCJPB. At CP Coast, north of Santa Clara Transit Center, the UP Coast Subdivision resumes and branches from the Peninsula Corridor, traveling north/northeast to CP Newark (MP 31.0), where it joins with the Niles Subdivision.
 Metrolink south of Moorpark.

The Peninsula Corridor Joint Powers Board purchased the line on the San Francisco Peninsula north of Tamien in 1991, and the line north of Santa Clara is primarily used by passenger services. Upgrades to signals and tracks to enable higher-speed operations were estimated to cost $360 million at the time. In the case of both purchases, SP retained freight trackage rights along those lines which continue to be held by the company's Union Pacific.

Service

Freight

Union Pacific freight trains run on the route, although the Fresno Subdivision through the San Joaquin Valley is the preferred north–south California route due to having easier grades and curves. The freight trains are typically local freights, empty baretable and autorack trains.

Passenger

The Coast Line is used by commuter, regional, and inter-city passenger trains:
 Amtrak California 
Pacific Surfliner (San Luis Obispo–San Diego)
Capitol Corridor (Auburn–San Jose)
 Amtrak Coast Starlight (Los Angeles–Seattle)
 Metrolink Ventura County Line (Ventura–Los Angeles)
 Caltrain (San Francisco–Gilroy)
 Altamont Corridor Express (San Jose–Stockton)

Local agencies along with the host railroads formed the Los Angeles–San Diego-San Luis Obispo Rail Corridor Agency (LOSSAN) in 1989 to work together on upgrading the route between San Luis Obispo and San Diego. Millions in enhancements to improve the reliability and safety of this  railroad corridor have been proposed by Caltrans and federal railroad officials. Ventura County would get rail curve realignments near Seacliff, the Santa Clara River and Montalvo in the near term for an estimated $300 million. Future rail service could include a Ventura–Santa Barbara commuter train. Long-range plans also including commuter service between Ventura and Santa Clarita along the original route through the Santa Clara River Valley. The Ventura County Transportation Commission purchased the Santa Paula Branch Line within Ventura County from Southern Pacific. While a portion of the line was abandoned after being washed out in Los Angeles County, the  Newhall Ranch development will provide for a route through the community.

See also
 Surf Line, the continuation south to San Diego
 Cal-P Line, the continuation north to Sacramento
 History of rail transportation in California
 Monterey County Rail Extension
 South Pacific Coast Railroad

References

Notes

Citations

Bibliography

External links
 

Rail lines in California
Union Pacific Railroad lines
Southern Pacific Railroad
Transportation in Ventura County, California
1900 establishments in California
Railway lines opened in 1900